For Mertens' results on the distribution of prime numbers, see Mertens' theorems.
 For Mertens' result on convergence of Cauchy products of series, see Cauchy product.